The Betty White Show is an American television series which aired on CBS from September 12, 1977, to January 9, 1978. Fourteen episodes were broadcast. The series was produced by MTM Enterprises. This program should not be confused with two earlier television programs that had the same title—a daytime talk show that ran on NBC from February 8, 1954 to December 31, 1954 and a prime-time comedy variety show that ran on ABC from February 5, 1958 to April 30, 1958.

Synopsis
Joyce Whitman (Betty White), a middle-aged actress, lands the lead in a police series titled Undercover Woman, a parody of Police Woman. Joyce is thrilled with the show, but less pleased to learn that the director is John Elliot (John Hillerman), her ex-husband, whom she unfondly refers to as "old pickle puss." He responds in kind, supplying his star with an oversized male double named Hugo (Charles Cyphers), a sexy, much younger onscreen sidekick (Caren Kaye), and dialogue not nearly as sharp as her tongue. Also on hand are Mitzi Maloney (Georgia Engel), Joyce's best friend; co-star actor Fletcher Huff (Barney Phillips); and network penny-pincher Doug Porterfield (Alex Henteloff).

Reception
The series was scheduled opposite Monday Night Football and The NBC Monday Movie and failed to generate viewers. The show was canceled after 14 episodes. Nick at Nite and TV Land briefly broadcast reruns of the show during the 1990s.

The series aired on Channel 4 in the United Kingdom in 1985.

Cast
 Betty White as Joyce Whitman, a sharp-tongued actress
 John Hillerman as John Elliot, Joyce's ex-husband and director of her show
 Georgia Engel as Mitzi Maloney, Joyce's naive best friend/roommate

Recurring
 Caren Kaye as Tracy Garrett, Joyce's younger, sexier co-star
 Charles Cyphers as Hugo Muncy, Joyce's hunky stunt double
 Barney Phillips as Fletcher Huff, Joyce's co-star
 Alex Henteloff as Doug Porterfield, a network executive who oversees Undercover Woman

Episodes

References

External links
 

1977 American television series debuts
1978 American television series endings
1970s American sitcoms
1970s American workplace comedy television series
English-language television shows
Television series about television
CBS original programming
Television series by MTM Enterprises
Television shows set in Los Angeles
Betty White
Television series about actors